The Ontario Liberal Party is a political party in the Canadian province of Ontario.

The party governed the province from 1871 to 1905, 1934 to 1943 and 1985 to 1990. It returned to power in 2003 by winning a majority government in that year's provincial election.

The Liberals ran a full slate of 103 candidates in the 2003 election, seventy-two of whom were elected. Several candidates have their own biography pages. Information about others may be found here.

Candidates
Algoma—Manitoulin: Mike Brown
Ancaster—Dundas—Flamborough—Aldershot: Ted McMeekin
Barrie—Simcoe—Bradford: Mike Ramsay
Beaches—East York: Monica Purdy
Burlington: Mark Fuller
Lanark—Carleton: Marianne Wilkinson
Nepean—Carleton: Rod Vanier
Ottawa Centre: Richard Patten
Ottawa—Orléans: Phil McNeely
Ottawa South: Dalton McGuinty
Ottawa—Vanier: Madeleine Meilleur
Ottawa West—Nepean: Jim Watson
Trinity—Spadina: Nellie Pedro

References

2003